Inuujarvik Territorial Park is a park in Kivalliq Region, Nunavut, Canada.  It is located along the shore of Baker Lake.

External links
 Nunavut Parks - Inuujarvik Territorial Park

Parks in Kivalliq Region
Territorial parks of Nunavut